Helenium amarum is a species of annual herb in the daisy family known by the common names yellowdicks, yellow sneezeweed, fiveleaf sneezeweed, and bitter sneezeweed. It is native to much of the south-central United States (Texas, Oklahoma, Louisiana, Arkansas, New Mexico) and northern Mexico (Chihuahua, Coahuila), and it is present elsewhere in North America, Australia, and the West Indies as an introduced species.

Helenium amarum is a multibranched bushy erect plant reaching 20 to 70 centimeters (8-28 inches) in height and thickly foliated in narrow to threadlike leaves. The tops of stem branches hold inflorescences of many daisy-like flower heads. Each head has a rounded center of sometimes as many as 250 golden yellow disc florets and a fringe of 8-10 usually lighter yellow ray florets which are reflexed away from the center. The fruit is a tiny achene about a millimeter long. This herb is weedy in some areas.

The plant is somewhat toxic to mammals and insects due to the presence of the lactone tenulin.

 Varieties
 Helenium amarum var. amarum - United States
 Helenium amarum var. badium Waterf. - Oklahoma, Texas, Chihuahua, Coahuila

References

External links
 Jepson Manual Treatment
 United States Department of Agriculture Plants Profile
 Calphotos Photo gallery, University of California
 Photo of herbaruim specimen at Missouri Botanical Garden, collected in Mississippi in 2007
 Illinois Wildflowers
 
 Discover Life

Plants described in 1817
Flora of North America
amarum